The Hobbit is an illustrated text adventure computer game released in 1982 for the ZX Spectrum home computer and based on the 1937 book The Hobbit, by J. R. R. Tolkien. It was developed at Beam Software by Philip Mitchell and Veronika Megler and published by Melbourne House. It was later converted to most home computers available at the time including the Commodore 64, BBC Micro, and Oric computers. By arrangement with the book publishers, a copy of the book was included with each game sold.

The parser was very advanced for the time and used a subset of English called Inglish. When it was released, most adventure games used simple verb-noun parsers (allowing for simple phrases like "get lamp"), but Inglish allowed the player to type advanced sentences such as "ask Gandalf about the curious map then take sword and kill troll with it". The parser was complex and intuitive, introducing pronouns, adverbs ("viciously attack the goblin"), punctuation and prepositions and allowing the player to interact with the game world in ways not previously possible.

Gameplay
Many locations are illustrated by an image, based on originals designed by Kent Rees. On the tape version, to save space, each image was stored in a compressed format by storing outline information and then flood filling the enclosed areas on the screen. The slow CPU speed meant that it would take up to several seconds for each scene to draw. The disk-based versions of the game used pre-rendered, higher-quality images.

The game has an innovative text-based physics system, developed by Veronika Megler. Objects, including the characters in the game, have a calculated size, weight, and solidity. Objects can be placed inside other objects, attached together with rope and damaged or broken. If the main character is sitting in a barrel and this barrel is then picked up and thrown through a trapdoor, the player would go through.

Unlike other works of interactive fiction, the game is also in real time, insofar as a period of idleness causes the "WAIT" command to be automatically invoked and the possibility of events occurring as a result. This can be suppressed by entering the "PAUSE" command, which stops all events until a key is pressed.

The game has a cast of non-player characters (NPCs) entirely independent of the player and bound to precisely the same game rules. They have loyalties, strengths, and personalities that affect their behaviour and cannot always be predicted. The character of Gandalf, for example, would roam freely around the game world (some fifty locations), picking up objects, getting into fights and being captured.

The volatility of the characters, coupled with the rich physics and impossible-to-predict fighting system, enabled the game to be played in many different ways, though this would also lead to problems (such as an important character being killed early on). There are numerous possible solutions and with hindsight, the game might be regarded as one of the first examples of emergent gameplay. This also resulted, however, in many bugs; for example, during development Megler found that the animal NPCs killed each other before the player arrived. The game's documentation warned that "Due to the immense size and complexity of this game it is impossible to guarantee that it will ever be completely error-free". Melbourne House issued a version 1.1 with some fixes, but with another bug that resulted in the game being unwinnable, forcing it to release version 1.2, and the company never fixed all bugs.

Development
Beam acquired the licence for computer rights to The Hobbit in 1980.

Reception
Info in 1985 rated The Hobbit on the Commodore 64 three-plus stars out of five, stating that the graphics were "pleasant but no show-stoppers", and that the game's parser and puzzles were "typical of most adventures today". The magazine concluded that "Tolkien fans will most likely be pleased with this title".

The Hobbit was a bestseller in the UK on the ZX Spectrum in 1983 and on both the C64 and BBC by the end of the year. The game won the 1983 Golden Joystick Award for best strategy game. The game was also a huge commercial success, selling over 100,000 copies in its first two years at a retail price of £14.95. The game sold over 500,000 units in Europe. The use of images on many of the locations as opposed to mostly text-only adventure games of the time, the flexibility of the Inglish parser, the innovative independence of the non-player characters, the popularity of Tolkien's work, all attributed to the game's phenomenal success.

In 1989, Macworld reviewed the Macintosh versions of The Hobbit, The Fellowship of the Ring and The Shadows of Mordor simultaneously, criticising The Hobbit, calling it "particularly clumsy" as it is "handicapped by a 400-word input vocabulary" as opposed to the latter two games' 800 words. Macworld called The Fellowship of the Ring "particularly intricate" and recommended it as an entry point to the series as opposed to The Hobbit. They praised The Hobbit's graphics, but stated that in the later titles the art adds little to the games' overall appeal. Furthermore, Macworld criticised the dated and rigid nature of the text-adventure format (although conceding that "the programming was undertaken almost a decade ago"), but acknowledged that the three games were "literate and faithful in spirit to original books".

Legacy
To help players a book called A Guide to Playing The Hobbit by David Elkan was published in 1984.

Developer Beam Software followed up The Hobbit with 1985's Lord of the Rings: Game One, 1987's Shadows of Mordor: Game Two of Lord of the Rings, and 1989's The Crack of Doom. They would also reuse Inglish in Sherlock.

In 1986 a parody of the game was released by CRL, The Boggit.

A phrase from the game which has entered popular culture is "Thorin sits down and starts singing about gold".

Also, the game is mentioned in Nick Montfort's, Twisty Little Passages, a book exploring the history and form of the interactive fiction genre.

Discworld Noir references The Hobbit: when the protagonist, Lewton, discovers that someone concealed themselves in a wine barrel, he wonders why that brings to mind the phrases "You wait – time passes" and "Thorin sits down and starts singing about gold".

References

External links
 
 
 
 Tolkien computer games
 
 Interview of Veronika Megler about 'The Hobbit' development
 Wilderland emulator which shows what's going on 'behind the scene' in the ZX Spectrum version
 

1980s interactive fiction
Interactive fiction based on works
1982 video games
Amstrad CPC games
Apple II games
BBC Micro and Acorn Electron games
Classic Mac OS games
Commodore 64 games
Dragon 32 games
Golden Joystick Award winners
MSX games
Oric games
Works based on The Hobbit
Video games about dragons
Video games based on Middle-earth
Video games developed in Australia
ZX Spectrum games